= Bankhanda =

- village
- Location in Uttar Pradesh, India Bankhanda (India)
- Coordinates: 28.43°N 77.55°E
- Country: India
- State: Uttar Pradesh
- District: Hapur

Government
  - Body: Gram panchayat
- Elevation: 200 m (660 ft)

Population (2001)
  - Total: 5,900 approx.

Languages
  - Official: Hindi
- Time zone: UTC+5:30 (IST)
- Vehicle registration: UP
- Website: up.gov.in

Bankhanda is a village in Hapur district in the Indian state Uttar Pradesh, which is located in national capital region The nearest local railway station is Kuchesar Road Chopla.
